Alessandro Gazzi (born 28 January 1983) is an Italian former professional footballer who played as a defensive midfielder.

He became an honorary citizen of the city of Reggio Calabria on 27 May 2007.

Club career

Early career 
He began his footballing career at Plavis, the youth team of his region, Santa Giustina. He then transferred to Montebelluna and immediately after to Treviso, with whom he debuted in the Serie B season of 2000–01, at age 17.

In the summer of 2001 he officially joined Lazio on a two-year loan, and was given a place in the youth team. He played for the youth team for two seasons, but never played for the first team, and in 2003 returned to Treviso at the end of the loan.

Viterbese 
In August 2003 he was sold outright to Viterbese, at the time led by former coach of Genoa Guido Carboni. He was a regular starter for the side, contesting 31 games scoring a goal. He played four games in the promotion play-offs to Serie B, which Viterbo lost in the final against Crotone.

At the end of the season the club was declared bankrupt, and Gazzi and all the players on the team were released on a free transfer.

Bari and Reggina 
In July 2004 he moved definitively to Bari in Serie B, along with his coach and teammates Vincenzo Santoruvo and Lorenzo Sibilano. In his first season in Apulia, he played 34 games and scored 3 goals, contributing to the final placement of 10th in the league standing.

The following year he took to the field 35 times, scoring 1 goal. On 4 January, he signed an extension until 2009. In the following season he played 11 games, but on the last day of the winter transfer market was sold to Reggina in co-ownership, where for the first time in his career he had the opportunity to play in Serie A. He made his debut in the top flight on 11 February 2007 in a win against Torino, and played 9 games until the end of the season. Thanks to his contribution, the team, then led by Walter Mazzarri, attains salvation in spite of an 11-point deduction due to the 2006 Italian football scandal. Gazzi was awarded, together with his companions, the title of honorary citizen of Reggio Calabria.

Return to Bari 
On 22 June 2007 the co-ownership agreement was resolved in favor of Bari, and the player returned to Apulia. On 22 September, during a game against Ravenna, he suffered an eye injury which forced him into hospital and resulted in two weeks on the sideline. On 21 November, he extended his contract with Bari until 2011.

In the 2008–09 season, with 39 appearances, Gazzi was one of the most active players in the promotion of Bari into Serie A, coached by Antonio Conte. The following year he was a fixture of the team led by Giampiero Ventura, playing 32 games in the top flight. On 7 April 2010 he signed a further contract extension until 2013, and during 2011–2012, despite relegation, he was again an impressive player, with 31 games played. On 10 April 2011 he scored his first goal in Serie A against Catania.

Siena 
After the relegation of Bari in Serie B, there were rumours of a possible transfer to Chievo Verona and especially Torino, but on 11 August 2011 a transfer was formalised to Sienna, newly promoted to Serie A.

The anchor of the midfield, made his debut under Giuseppe Sannino on 11 September against Catania and scored his first goal for the bianconeri 20 November, in a home game against Atalanta. He played 33 games for the club, scoring 1 goal.

Torino 
On 13 July 2012 Gazzi was sold to Torino for €2.5 million cash, plus Matteo Rubin to Sienna in co-ownership. He officially debuted for Torino on 18 August 2012, in a Coppa Italia fixture against Lecce; his league debut for the Granata was on 26 August, against his former club, Siena. He scored his first goal for Torino on 30 September in a 1–5 win away against Atalanta. He concluded the 2012–13 season with 34 appearances and 2 goals - plus an appearance in Coppa Italia. On 28 August 2014 he made his debut in European competition in a 1–0 defeat of HNK Hajduk Split. In February 2015 he renewed his contract with the club until the end of the 2015–16 season.

Palermo 
On 3 August 2016, Palermo announced the signing of Gazzi from Torino. Upon signing for the club, he was handed the number 14 shirt.

Alessandria 
On 2 August 2017, signed a two years deal with Alessandria. In the summer of 2018, his contract was renewed until June 2020.

2011–12 Italian football scandal 

In the month of August 2012, he was investigated by prosecutors in Bari for sporting fraud, along with his other former teammates at A.S. Bari, in regard to match-fixing in the past.

On 6 June 2013, he was suspended for 3 months and 10 days, plus a fine of €40,000.

Style of play 
Although he is capable of playing in several midfield positions, Gazzi is usually deployed as a central or defensive midfielder, due to his work-rate, ball-winning abilities, as well as capacity to organise his team and distribute the ball to team-mates after winning back possession, despite his lack of notable technical skills. Known for his professionalism and consistency, he is a tenacious player of great physicality and determination, who possesses a strong left foot.

Career statistics

Club
Updated 31 May 2015.

Honours

Club
Baru
 Serie B: 2008–09

References

External links

Profile of Alessandro Gazzi on Torinofc.it
 http://www.gazzetta.it/speciali/serie_b/2008_nw/giocatori/57128.shtml

1983 births
Sportspeople from the Province of Belluno
Living people
Italian footballers
Association football midfielders
Treviso F.B.C. 1993 players
S.S. Lazio players
U.S. Viterbese 1908 players
S.S.C. Bari players
Reggina 1914 players
A.C.N. Siena 1904 players
Torino F.C. players
Palermo F.C. players
U.S. Alessandria Calcio 1912 players
Serie A players
Serie B players
Serie C players
Footballers from Veneto